Steffen Kotré (born 29 April 1974 in East Berlin, East Germany) is a German politician for the Alternative for Germany (AfD) and since 2017 member of the Bundestag.

Life and politics

Kotre was born 1974 in East Berlin and studied engineering management.
He is member of the fraternity Corps Berlin.

In 2013, Kotre entered the newly founded Alternative for Germany (AfD) and after the 2017 German federal election became a member of the Bundestag representing Brandenburg.

As of 2019, Kotre denied the scientific consensus on climate change.

In February 2023, Kotré appeared in a Russian TV show by Vladimir Solovyov (TV presenter). He stated that German mainstream media were doing all they could to turn Germans against Russia and criticised German weapon deliveries to Ukraine. According to an AfD spokesman Kotré’s participation in the TV show was "not known" to the party.

References

1974 births
Politicians from Berlin
Members of the Bundestag for Brandenburg
Living people
Members of the Bundestag 2021–2025
Members of the Bundestag 2017–2021
Members of the Bundestag for the Alternative for Germany